Meisdorf House is a schloss in the village of Meisdorf in the borough of Falkenstein in the German federal state of Saxony-Anhalt, that is now used as a hotel. It was built in 1708 with a  castle park.

History 
In the second half of the 18th century Meisdorf and the nearby Falkenstein Castle came into the possession of court official and diplomat, Achatz Ferdinand of Asseburg. Meisdorf had belonged to the seigneurie of Falkenstein since the middle age, and the latter to the House of Asseburg since 1437. As Falkenstein castle, at the time, was only used as a hunting lodge and the old Meisdorf manor had become too small for the needs of the lords, he built this new, more spacious, albeit simple residence in 1787, and had the existing house converted into an official's quarter. The new mansion, of which the facade faced away from the village Meisdorf, was linked with it through an avenue of lime and chestnut trees, 400 paces long.

After the death of its builder, who was buried, together with his family, in a baroque style mausoleum he had built in a hewn, with solid rock in the nearby Selke valley, the house became the property of the Neindorf line of the family of Asseburg. As this line expired in 1816, upon the death of the vicar capitular Louis Busso of Asseburg, the lordship of Falkenstein went to the Eggenstedt-Ampfurt line.

Later, the Prussian privy councillor and court hunter Louis, Count of Asseburg-Falkenstein, became its owner and had avenues created on both sides of the mansion towards Ballenstedt and Harzgerode. A large park and lush lawns surrounded the house at his time. In addition, there was a deciduous wood around the house, through which a road was built towards a neo-gothic sandstone mausoleum, and another to a Swiss Cottage on top of a hill above the house.

Closely behind the house, stables and gardens, there is the Selke valley.

The mill (Schlossmühle) in the grounds of the house and the family mausoleum (no. 207) are checkpoints in the Harzer Wandernadel hiking trail network.

References

Sources 
 Sammlung Duncker, Schloss Meisdorf (digital file)

Houses completed in 1708
Castles in Saxony-Anhalt
Castles in the Harz
Falkenstein, Saxony-Anhalt
1708 establishments in the Holy Roman Empire